Lungtok Gyatso, shortened from Lobzang Tenpai Wangchuk Lungtok Gyatso (also spelled Lungtog Gyatso and Luntok Gyatso; 1 December 18056 March 1815), was the 9th Dalai Lama of Tibet. He was the only Dalai Lama to die in childhood and was first of a string of four Dalai Lamas to die before reaching 22 years of age.

Early life 
Under auspicious signs, Lungtok Gyatso was born near the monastery of Dan Chokhor (or Denchokor), on 1 December 1805. Many sources render him as an orphan, but others name his parents as Tendzin Chokyong and Dondrub Dolma. A contestant to be the next Dalai Lama since early infancy, the boy was brought to Gungtang monastery near Lhasa, where he was examined by Tibetan officials, including the Qing representatives, the ambans. He was the favored choice of the Eighth Dalai Lama's attendants. He was ultimately identified by the Seventh Panchen Lama, Gedun Choekyi Nyima, who, in 1808, performed the tonsure ceremony and gave him the name Lobzang Tenpai Wangchuk Lungtok Gyatso.

Life as Dalai Lama 

In 1810, he was enthroned at the Potala Palace on the Golden Throne of the Ganden Po-drang Government. This same year the elderly Regent, Ta-task Nga-wang Gon-po died and the De-mo Tul-ku Nga-wang Lo-zang Tub-ten Jig-me Gya-tso (d. 1819) was appointed to replace him.

"The English explorer Thomas Manning, who reached Lhasa in 1812, described his meeting with the 9th Dalai Lama, who was seven years old at the time, in rhapsodic terms. 'The lama's beautiful and interesting face engrossed all my attention,' Manning wrote. 'He had the simple, unaffected manners of a well-educated princely child. His face was, I thought, affectingly beautiful. He was of a gay and cheerful disposition. I was extremely affected by this interview with the lama. I could have wept through strangeness of sensation.'"

The Seventh Panchen Lama gave the boy the vows of novice monk in Lhasa in 1812, on 22 September. Lungtok Gyatso is said to have had a great interest in dharma and sharp intellect, memorizing lengthy prayer texts, root-texts of Abhisamayālaṅkāra, Mādhyamaka and Abhidharmakośa. Ngwang Nyandak (The Sixty-sixth Ganden Tripa), Jangchub Chopel (who later became the Sixty-ninth Ganden Tripa) and Yeshe Gyatso were also among his teachers.

Death 
The nine-year-old Dalai Lama came down with a cold at the annual Monlam Prayer Festival. He died in Tibet on 6 March 1815. "The entire nation was plunged into sorrow", which lasted until the recognition of the new reincarnation eight years later. His body was installed in a golden reliquary in the Potala Palace called Serdung Sasum Ngonga.

"During the period of the short-lived Dalai Lamas—from the Ninth to the Twelfth incarnations—the Panchen was the lama of the hour, filling the void left by the four Dalai Lamas who died in their youth."

References

Sources 
 
 
 
 

|-

1805 births
1815 deaths
9
Monarchs who died as children
Child monarchs from Asia
19th-century Tibetan people